Lieutenant General Tadesse Werede Tesfay is Commander-in Chief of the Tigray Defense Forces. He was born in Mekelle, a city in Enderta woreda of the Tigray Region.  

He was the Head of Mission and Force Commander of the United Nations Interim Security Force for Abyei (UNISFA) from its inception in 2011 until 2013. He was appointed by the United Nations Secretary-General Ban Ki-moon to implement the mandate of the UN peacekeeping mission in the region of Abyei in Sudan, an oil-producing region with disputable borders between the governments of Sudan and South Sudan.

UNISFA was established by the United Nations Security Council Resolution 1990 of 27 June 2011. Lieutenant General Tadesse Werede Tesfay was appointed to oversee the monitoring and verification of the withdrawal of all armed forces in Abyei.

References

External links
UNISFA website
United Nations Press Release announcing appointment
"Sudan: UN authorises peacekeepers for Abyei". BBC News website, 27 June 2011

Living people
1958 births
Ethiopian generals
Ethiopian officials of the United Nations
People from Mekelle
T